Lokaltrafikk is a quarterly magazine published by Lokaltrafikkhistorisk Forening and Sporveishistorisk Forening in Oslo, Norway.

History and profile
Lokaltrafikk was founded in 1986. It is dominated by news and feature articles about domestic tram, rapid transit and light rail, but also has a news section and featured articles about international urban rail transport and domestic bus transport.

See also
 List of railroad-related periodicals

References

1986 establishments in Norway
Magazines established in 1986
Magazines published in Oslo
Norwegian-language magazines
Quarterly magazines published in Norway
Rail transport magazines published in Norway